Tristan Cousins (born 1 August 1982) is a British former competitive figure skater. Competing in men's singles, he won a junior national gold medal at the 2000 British Championships at the age of eighteen, a senior international bronze medal at the 2004 Ondrej Nepela Memorial at the age of twenty-two, and a senior national bronze medal at the 2008 British Championships at the age of twenty-five. He is the nephew of former Olympic gold medalist Robin Cousins.

Early life
Tristan was born on 1 August 1982 in London, England. His parents are June and Martin Cousins. His father is a financial adviser and the older brother of Robin Cousins. He has one older brother, also called Robin. Tristan began skating in 1990 at the age of eight.

Skating career
In July 2000, after successfully completing his A levels, Tristan joined the skating academy at Centrum Arena in Prestwick on the west coast of Scotland, under Canadian coach Kevin Bursey. In November 2000, the British Figure Skating Championships were held at the Centrum Arena, where Tristan won a gold medal in the Junior Men singles category.

In March 2002, he qualified for the free skate at the 2002 World Junior Championships at the Hamar Olympic Amphitheatre (now CC Amfi) in Hamar, Norway.

He won an international bronze medal at the 12th Ondrej Nepela Memorial competition in September 2004 in Bratislava.

In January 2008, he won a senior national bronze medal at the 2008 British Championships in Sheffield, England. He retired from competitive skating the same year.

Tristan worked for a number of years as a figure skating coach (NCCP Level 2 Performance) at the National Ice Centre in Nottingham. He was a member of the coaching staff in the NIC Figure Skating Academy, working alongside his former coach Joy Suttcliffe and the Director of Skating Gurgen Vardanjan. One notable former pupil is figure skater Josh Brown. Tristan left the NIC at the end of 2014 to concentrate on his archaeological studies.

Personal life
On 10 March 2012, Tristan appeared in an episode of All Star Family Fortunes with his uncle Robin Cousins, his brother Robin and his two cousins Oliver and James. Their opponents were the family of actress Dawn Steele. The Cousins family made it through to the Big Money round, where Tristan and uncle Robin took part, but they failed to win the top cash prize.

He studied archaeology at the University of Nottingham, where he obtained a BA in Archaeology and History.

Tristan has performed in a number of ice shows, for example in December 2004 he took part in an ice show in Glasgow which was produced by his uncle Robin Cousins.

Programs

Competitive highlights

References

External links
 
 Official site of Tristan Cousins

British male single skaters
English male single skaters
1982 births
Living people
Sportspeople from London